The New Mexico Commissioner of Public Lands is an elected constitutional officer in the executive branch in charge of managing all state lands and mineral rights, as well as overseeing leases and royalties on state land, in the U.S. state of New Mexico. The Commissioner of Public Lands is elected to a four-year term and is able to serve up to two consecutive terms; more terms may be served after one full term has intervened.

Currently, Stephanie Garcia Richard is serving as Commissioner of Public Lands. She took office on January 1, 2019.

List of Commissioners of Public Lands

Notes

References

External links
New Mexico State Land Office
Commissioner of Public Lands of New Mexico home page